Petru Hvorosteanov (born 28 August 1986) is a Moldovan former professional footballer.

External links
 
 
 Profile at pressball.by

1986 births
Living people
Moldovan footballers
Association football midfielders
Moldovan expatriate footballers
Expatriate footballers in Uzbekistan
Expatriate footballers in Lithuania
Expatriate footballers in Belarus
FC Iskra-Stal players
FC Dacia Chișinău players
FC Zimbru Chișinău players
FK Andijon players
FC Šiauliai players
FC Costuleni players
FC Slavia Mozyr players
FC Academia Chișinău players